Sally Haydon (February 10, 1959 – April 13, 2014) was an American professor of equine science and a trainer of American Saddlebred horses and riders. She was Chair of the Equine Studies department at Midway College in Midway, Kentucky, president and founder of the Intercollegiate Saddle Seat Riding Association (ISSRA), and the Owner/Director of Educational Programs at the Bluegrass Riding Academy. Haydon worked several years teaching saddle seat equitation with renowned trainer and author Helen Crabtree, and she was also a former board member of The Cleveland Home (at Cleveland House).

References

External links
 Sunrise Stables Riding Academy (Versailles, Kentucky), Staff, http://www.sunrisestable.com/ridingacademy_staff.shtml
 Midway College Equine Programs, http://www.midway.edu/academic-programs/equine
 "Use of a modified relative dose response test or vitamin a fractionation test for determining vitamin A status from serum in the horse and rabbit," Sally Haydon Jarrett, doctoral dissertation, University of Arizona, http://hdl.handle.net/10150/183958

1959 births
2014 deaths
Morehead State University alumni
University of Kentucky alumni
University of Arizona alumni
American Saddlebred breeders and trainers
Kentucky women scientists
21st-century American women